Bukovac is a village in the municipality of Preševo, Serbia. According to the 2002 census, the village has a population of 108 people of whom 67 (62,03 %) were ethnic Albanians and 41 (37,96 %) others.

References

Populated places in Pčinja District
Preševo
Albanian communities in Serbia